AWE (A Wealth of Entertainment; formerly Wealth TV) is an American lifestyle and entertainment cable network. Privately held by Herring Networks, Inc., the network operates several domestic and international television feeds while its primary production facilities and corporate headquarters are located in San Diego, California.

History

AWE debuted in 2004, under the name Wealth TV. It was founded by Robert Herring Sr. and his sons.

Herring hired Dean Harris as general manager and gave him a 5% stake in the channel. Harris was a former stock broker and convicted felon who was barred from trading by the Securities and Exchange Commission and served a 32-month federal prison sentence. Herring said that he did not know of Harris' prison term until he was informed by a reporter for Reuters.

In 2007 and 2008, Wealth TV filed carriage access complaints with the Federal Communications Commission (FCC) against the owners of iN DEMAND, namely Comcast, Time Warner Cable, Bright House Networks, and Cox Communications. Herring alleged that the companies refused to air Wealth TV because it competed against a lifestyle network co-owned by them. In March 2013, an appeals court ruled in favor of the cable operators.

On January 14, 2022, DirecTV announced that its contract with Herring Networks, including carriage of AWE and its controversial sister channel One America News Network (OANN), would not be renewed, and the networks would be removed in early April from its satellite and U-verse TV services. The channels were removed on April 4, 2022. On July 30, 2022, Verizon FiOS removed the channel from its lineup.

Programming 
AWE operates a 24/7 channel domestically as well as an international feed with alternate programming in which it owns the worldwide rights. The network also offers its 24/7 feeds and programs on demand through multiple digital media playing devices.

Live championship boxing 

In 2011, WealthTV began airing live professional boxing branded under "Wealth TV's Fight Night". In July 2012, the network aired its first live pay-per-view (PPV) event branded "Wealth TV PPV". Wealth TV received multiple recognitions for its boxing efforts in 2012. The Boxing Writers Association of America, BWAA, recognized six fights for 2012 as nominees for best fight of the year, two of which were aired live on Wealth TV. David Price, a heavyweight boxer featured exclusively in the US on Wealth TV in 2012, was recognized by leading boxing authority Dan Rafael of ESPN as the top Prospect of the Year.

AWE has aired many bouts, including the matchup of Ricky Burns against Ray Beltran for the world lightweight title (2013), and the crowning of American, Terence Crawford, after his defeat of Ricky Burns (2014).

References

External links

Television networks in the United States
Television channels and stations established in 2004
Companies based in San Diego
2004 establishments in California